The European Finance Association (EFA) is a professional association of more than 2,000 professionals and financial economists involved in the high-level research, study, teaching, and practice of finance.  The association was founded in 1974 and hosts an annual meeting in August. The 40th annual meeting of the EFA was held in Cambridge, UK in 2013. The 48th annual meeting was be chaired by EFA President Professor Elena Carletti and was organised by Bocconi University in Milan, Italy in August 2021.  The 49th annual meeting was organised by IESE Business School in Barcelona, Spain, in August 2022 and chaired by EFA Vice President Professor Xavier Vives. The 50th annual meeting will be held in Amsterdam, The Netherlands, in 2023 chaired by Professor Albert J. Mankveld at Vrij Universiteit Amsterdam.  EFA also organises doctoral events including an intensive and competitive tutorial designed for PhD students in Finance who are nearing the end of their doctoral thesis and will soon be on the job market.

The flagship journal of the European Finance Association is the Review of Finance. The current managing editor of the Review of Finance is Alex Edmans.  The peer-reviewed journal Journal is published by Oxford University Press. There are two prizes awarded for papers published in Review of Finance: the Spängler IQAM Prize and the Pagano and Zechner Prize which are presented at the EFA Annual Meeting.  

The European Finance Association (EFA) is an international non-profit organization (INPO / AISBL / IVZW) registered in Belgium at the following address: European Finance Association, Rue Fossé aux Loups, 38, 1000 Brussels, Belgium with Company Number RPM/RPR 0864.639.588.

References

External links 
 European Finance Association Home Page
 40th Annual Meeting of the European Finance Association
48th Annual Meeting of the European Finance Association
49th Annual Meeting of the European Finance Association
50th Annual Meeting for the European Finance Association
 Review of Finance home page

Business organisations based in Belgium
Business organizations based in Europe
Economics societies
Financial economics